Dumitru Gheorghiu (born December 14, 1904, date of death unknown) was a Romanian bobsledder who competed in the 1930s. He won a silver medal in the four-man event at the 1934 FIBT World Championships in Garmisch-Partenkirchen, Germany.

At the 1936 Winter Olympics in Garmisch-Partenkirchen, Gheorgiu finished 16th in the two-man event and did not finish in the four-man event.

References
 1936 bobsleigh two-man results
 1936 bobsleigh four-man results
 Bobsleigh four-man world championship medalists since 1930

1904 births
Bobsledders at the 1936 Winter Olympics
Olympic bobsledders of Romania
Romanian male bobsledders
Year of death missing